Johnny Lee Rembert (born January 19, 1961) is a former professional American football player who played linebacker for ten seasons for the New England Patriots of the National Football League (NFL). Rembert was a key member of the 1985 AFC champions who played the Chicago Bears in Super Bowl XX in New Orleans. He was also selected to the AFC Pro Bowl team twice (1988 and 1989). He has recently retired as the Director of Athletics at Edward Waters College in Jacksonville, Florida and also the Quality Control Representative for the NFL.

References

1961 births
Living people
American football linebackers
Clemson Tigers football players
Edward Waters Tigers athletic directors
New England Patriots players
American Conference Pro Bowl players
People from Hollandale, Mississippi
Players of American football from Mississippi